Fourth Battle of Savo Island may refer to the following battles during the Guadalcanal Campaign in the Pacific War of World War II:

 Naval Battle of Guadalcanal, a battle that took place November 12 – 15, 1942
 Battle of Tassafaronga, a battle that took place November 30, 1942